Leslie Michael "Les" Bock (born March 5, 1949) is a former Democratic Idaho State Senator from the Garden City-based 16th District. He was a member of the Idaho House of Representatives from 2006 until 2008.

Education
Bock earned his bachelor's degree from University of California, Davis and then his Juris Doctor degree from University of California, Hastings College of the Law. He was born in Rolette, North Dakota.

Elections
In February 2014, Bock announced he would run for a judicial seat in southwestern Idaho. Bock was defeated by Incumbent Judge Richard D. Greenwood of District 4, taking only 44.2% of the vote

Idaho Senate District 16

2012 
Bock was unopposed for the Democratic primary. Bock defeated Republican nominee Joan Cloonan (who replaced Dennis C. Warren on the general ballot after his withdrawal following him winning the Republican primary, unopposed) with 57.3% of the vote in the general election.

2010 
Bock was unopposed for the Democratic primary. Brock defeated Republican nominee Bill Eisenbarth with 53.7% of the vote in the general election.

2008 
Bock was unopposed for the Democratic primary. Brock defeated Republican nominee Christ Troupis with 57.6% of the vote in the general election.

Idaho House of Representatives District 16 Seat B

2006 
Brock was unopposed for the Democratic primary. Brock defeated incumbent Republican Jana Kemp with 52.8% of the vote in the general election.

References

External links
Les Bock at the Idaho Legislature
 

Living people
Idaho lawyers
Democratic Party Idaho state senators
Democratic Party members of the Idaho House of Representatives
People from Boise, Idaho
People from Rolette County, North Dakota
University of California, Davis alumni
University of California, Hastings College of the Law alumni
1949 births